100 Tula Para Kay Stella is a 2017 Philippine romantic film directed by Jason Paul Laxamana and starring Bela Padilla and JC Santos. It was produced under Viva Films.

Synopsis
In 2004, Fidel Lansangan (JC Santos) and Stella Puno (Bela Padilla) meet each other as freshmen college students in Pampanga pursuing a bachelor's degree in Psychology. They became friends despite differences in their personalities; Fidel is an honor student with a speech impediment and loves poetry while Stella is a rocker with a tough and confident attitude who prefers to jam with her band rather than to do her studies.

Fidel begins to write poems to express his love to Stella but does not have the confidence to read these to her. Stella on her had various boyfriends as she pursues her goal of securing a recording contract. The film's story spans for four whole years of Fidel and Stella's college life and revolves around the question whether Fidel can muster enough confidence to read his poems to Stella.

Cast

Bela Padilla as Stella Puno
JC Santos as Fidel Lansangan
Mayton Eugenio as Danica
Caleb Santos as Von
Prince Stefan as Chuck
Ana Abad Santos as Ms. Bardozo
Dennis Padilla as Fidel's Dad

Production
100 Tula Para Kay Stella was produced under Viva Films. Jason Paul Laxamana served as both the writer and director of the film. The story of the film was inspired from Laxamana's own life experiences. The script was already finished as early as 2015 when principal photography of the film began.

Scenes were shot in Pampanga for the film.

Release
The film had a theatrical release in the Philippines on August 16, 2017 as one of the twelve official entries at the 2017 Pista ng Pelikulang Pilipino. The film was given a Parental Guidance (PG) rating by the Movie and Television Review and Classification Board.

Reception

Box office
100 Tula Para Kay Stella garnered millions worth of box office on its opening day on August 16, 2017. By August 18, the film is reportedly the leading film among the twelve entries at the Pista ng Pelikulang Pilipino in terms of box office returns. Viva Films stated on August 21, 2017 that the film has grossed .

Critical reception
The film was given an "A" rating by the Cinema Evaluation Board.

Fred Hawson in a review published in ABS-CBN News rates the film 6 out of 10. He writes that people expecting for a "lighthearted funny romp" will have their expectation challenged as he finds the film heavy to watch saying that the audience would feel the frustration and pain of the two protagonists of the film. He also expressed his opinion that actual teenagers could have portrayed the lead roles as he finds it "difficult to accept" Santos and Padilla portraying characters who are 17 years old and described their face as "unmistakably more mature" than actual teenagers. He described 100 Tula Para Kay Stella as a "gender switched" version of another film, I'm Drunk, I Love You. He particularly praised the portrayal of Ana Abad Santos for her role as Ms. Bardozo, Fidel and Stella's English teacher. He also acknowledge the efforts of the production designer for their work in the film set some decades ago from the film's release.

Soundtrack 
The 2004 hit "Balisong" was recorded by The Juans and served as the theme song of the film. It was originally recorded by Filipino rock band Rivermaya from their 2003 album Between the Stars and Waves.

References

External links

2017 films
Films shot in Pampanga
Films set in Pampanga
Films set in the 2000s
Philippine teen romance films
Films set in universities and colleges
Viva Films films